Oph 162225-240515, often abbreviated Oph 1622, and also known as Oph 11, is a pair of brown dwarfs that have been reported as orbiting each other. The bodies are located in the constellation Scorpius and are about 400 light years away. Mass estimates of the two objects are uncertain, but they are probably each higher than the brown-dwarf/planet dividing line of 13 Jupiter masses. Oph1622B is located 1.94 arcseconds from Oph1622A, at a position angle of 182°.

The discovery of the pair was announced in a 2006 Science article by Ray Jayawardhana and  Valentin D. Ivanov
. The objects were discovered using telescopes of the European Southern Observatory's New Technology Telescope in La Silla, Chile. The masses were originally reported to be lower, at 14 and 7 Jupiter masses, which would have made the smaller object a planetary-mass object, or planemo. The system was announced as the first reported binary system of objects this small. However, later observations and calculations have revised the masses upward. Close et al. estimate the mass of the primary, designated Oph1622A as 12–21 times that of Jupiter and 9–20 Jupiter masses for the less massive Oph1622B, while Luhman et al. assign values of 57 and 20 Jupiter masses. Despite the acronym "Oph" appearing in its name (implying that it may belong to the young Ophiuchus molecular cloud), Oph1622 is likely to be older than its originally adopted age of 1 million years. More likely, it is a member of the Upper Scorpius subgroup of the Scorpius–Centaurus association, which has an age of 11 million years. For an adopted age of 11 million years, the system has inferred masses of 53 and 21 Jupiter masses, similar to that derived by Luhman et al.

The distance between the two is approximately 240 AU—a distance so great that Space.com wrote that "their connection is so tenuous ... that a passing star or brown dwarf could permanently separate the two objects." As such, the discovery was reported as casting doubt on the theory that such free-floating planet-like objects have been ejected from a stellar system, such an event being too violent to leave them in such a wide orbit around each other. Given their wide separation and high masses, the system is best thought of as a wide brown dwarf binary rather than a binary planetary system.

See also
 2M1101AB
 UScoCTIO 108
 SDSS J1416+1348
 Binary brown dwarfs

References

External links
 https://www.sciencedaily.com/releases/2006/08/060804084105.htm
 http://www.spacedaily.com/reports/Astronomers_Discover_Twin_Planemos_999.html
 http://www.space.com/scienceastronomy/060803_planemo_twins.html
 http://news.bbc.co.uk/1/hi/sci/tech/5241774.stm

Scorpius (constellation)
Brown dwarfs
Upper Scorpius